Heinz Drache (9 February 1923 – 3 April 2002) was a German film actor. He appeared in more than 40 films between 1953 and 2002. He was born in Essen, Germany and died in Berlin, Germany of lung cancer.

Selected filmography

 Once I Will Return (1953) - Bob Emerson
 It Was Always So Nice With You (1954) - Komponist Peter Martens
 Spy for Germany (1956) - Jim Newman
  (1957) - Klaus Jäger
 Endangered Girls (1958) - Heinz Sanders
  (1958) - Wolf Siebert - Young Patron
 The Street (1958) - Bob Schneider
 The Rest Is Silence (1959) - Herbert von Pohl
 The Woman by the Dark Window (1960) - Andreas Wegner
  (1960) - Kurt
 The Avenger (1960) - Michael Brixan
 Town Without Pity (1961) - Maj. Steve Garrett (voice, uncredited)
  (1962) (TV miniseries) - Kriminalinspektor Yates
 The Door with Seven Locks (1962) - Inspektor Richard "Dick" Martin
  (1962) - Inspector Kaufmann
 The Black Panther of Ratana (1963) - Richard Paddberg
 The Squeaker (1963) - Inspector Bill Elford
 The Indian Scarf (1963) - Frank Tanner
  (1964) - Anthony Nash
 Coffin from Hong Kong (1964) - Nelson Ryan
 Der Hexer (1964) - James W. Wesby
 Coast of Skeletons (1965) - Janny Von Koltze
 Sandy the Seal (1965 released in 1969) - Jan Van Heerden
 Shots in Threequarter Time (1965) - Pierre Gilbert
 Neues vom Hexer (1965) - Inspector James W. Wesby
  (1966) - Hoffmann
 Circus of Fear (1966) - Carl
 The Brides of Fu Manchu (1966) - Franz Baumer
 Casse-tête chinois pour le judoka (1967)
 The Hound of Blackwood Castle (1968) - Humphrey Connery
 Derrick - Season 6, Episode 10: "Das dritte Opfer" (1979) - Martin Dorp

References

External links
 
 

1923 births
2002 deaths
German male film actors
Actors from Essen
20th-century German male actors